Satsu  is a fictional character created by Joss Whedon for Buffy the Vampire Slayer Season Eight, a comic book continuation of the television series Buffy the Vampire Slayer. Introduced as one of the strongest Slayers, she has a close relationship with her mentor Buffy Summers. Satsu develops romantic feelings for Buffy, and the two have a brief sexual relationship. She becomes the leader of her own Slayer squadron in Tokyo, and forms a friendship with fellow Slayer Kennedy during her performance review. She also makes a minor appearance in Buffy the Vampire Slayer Season Ten.

Whedon and Wolves at the Gate writer Drew Goddard said that Satsu's sexual relationship with Buffy was developed as a way to explore both characters. Her tryst with Buffy drew mixed responses from the media. Several commentators felt that the story arc maintained the show's focus on exploring one's sexuality, and provided insight on Buffy's sexual identity. Others criticized it as a publicity stunt saying it was out of character for Buffy. Feedback to Satsu as a character was also mixed, with the focus placed on the portrayal of her sexuality and race.

Arc
Born into a traditional Japanese family, Satsu was pressured by her parents to marry and have children. She faced a backlash from them after coming out as a lesbian. While attending high school, Satsu was activated as a Slayer because of the events of "Chosen" and received all the associated powers. After joining a squad of Slayers based in Scotland, she was recognized as one of the most skilled fighters, and worked closely with her mentor Buffy Summers. Satsu developed romantic feelings for Buffy, which becomes clear after she wakes Buffy from a mystical sleep with a true love's kiss. While taking Satsu on an assignment to destroy a nest of vampires, Buffy reveals that she knew of Satsu's feelings for her; she warns Satsu against pursuing a relationship with her because her past romances have ended in death.

Buffy and Satsu eventually have sex and are discovered in bed by Buffy's friends Willow Rosenberg, Xander Harris, Andrew Wells, and Dawn Summers. Count Dracula steals Buffy's scythe and she recruits Satsu as part of the team to recover it from Tokyo. During the trip to Japan, Willow comforts Satsu and reminds her of Buffy's responsibilities as a general and her heterosexuality. After successfully reclaiming the scythe, Satsu chooses to distance herself from Buffy by remaining in Japan as the leader of the country's Slayer squadron. Buffy and Satsu have sex one last time before they separate.

Fellow Slayer Kennedy is assigned to assess Satsu's performance as a leader and uses the opportunity to discuss her residual feelings for Buffy. She advises Satsu to accept that Buffy is straight and not interested in her sexually or romantically. While working in Japan, Satsu had proven to be an effective leader; one notable achievement being how she led her squad to commandeer a vampire-controlled submarine.

Kennedy and Satsu discover prototypes for a line of demonic stuffed animals known as the Swell. One of the demons possesses Satsu, causing her to behave more like a traditional Japanese woman, such as wearing a furisode-style kimono. When confronted by Kennedy, Satsu behaves in an increasingly misogynistic and homophobic manner. After Kennedy saves Satsu from the possession, the duo destroys the Swell's shipments. While vampire Harmony Kendall leads an anti-Slayer campaign, Buffy advises the Slayers to change themselves to better fit the new world; Satsu uses the speech as an incentive to abandon her feelings for Buffy.

Satsu later appears during the battle with the season's big bad Twilight and his army in Tibet. She initially disagrees with the plan to temporarily disable Slayer powers, along with the other members of the army, in an attempt to escape notice by Twilight, but she remains loyal to Buffy. She later responds angrily when she sees Buffy and Angel having sex to give birth to a new universe. In Buffy the Vampire Slayer Season Ten, Buffy's boyfriend Spike mentions that he is aware of her sexual tryst with Satsu. Satsu would later reappear to convince Buffy to collaborate with the vampire community to handle the frequent demonic invasions on Earth. During this time, she is revealed to be working for the United States Armed Forces, and in a relationship with an undisclosed partner.

Development

Satsu was one of several original characters introduced in Buffy the Vampire Slayer Season Eight, a comic book continuation of the television series Buffy the Vampire Slayer. The show's creator Joss Whedon wanted Satsu's relationship with Buffy to progress organically during the development of the comics. Establishing Buffy as grappling with feelings of isolation and Satsu as in love with her, Whedon described the story arc as "an opportunity for drama and character exploration". He clarified that he wanted the storyline to portray Buffy as "young and experimenting, and [...] open-minded," and that this did not translate as the character coming out as gay.

When discussing Satsu's role in Buffy's character development  Dark Horse Comics editor Scott Allie referred to their relationship as an "ill-conceived romance" that exemplifies Buffy's faults as a general to her army. Wolves at the Gate writer Drew Goddard said the transition of Buffy the Vampire Slayer to comics allowed for more creative freedom, and cited Satsu's relationship with Buffy as an example. Goddard explained that the character and her story arc with Buffy were not designed to be "a grand political statement," and said: "We just try to do what feels right for the characters. The rest takes care of itself."

Whedon acknowledged the criticism aimed at him for killing off lesbian character Tara Maclay in the show's sixth season as reflecting the "whole cliché about lesbians being killed"; he said that he would factor this response into his representation of Satsu, but explained: "You do have to be careful about the message you're sending out. It's a double-edged sword. You have to be responsible, but you also have to be irresponsible or you're not telling the best stories." When asked about the character's future, following her sexual tryst with Buffy, Whedon said that she would remain "in the rotation" as a recurring character in the comics. While discussing the possible reception to Satsu and Buffy having sex, Goddard predicted that readers would mirror the responses of the main characters by being "surprised at first, then intrigued as to what it all means" before moving forward to the next storyline.

Critical reception

Relationship with Buffy
The relationship between Satsu and Buffy was praised for carrying over the focus on exploring sexuality from Buffy the Vampire Slayer to the comic books. GLAAD entertainment media director Damon Romine praised the storyline as an example of the "multidimensional lesbian characters in the Buffy universe". In her 2017 book The Fanfiction Reader: Folk Tales for the Digital Age, Muhlenberg College Professor Francesca Coppa wrote that Buffy the Vampire Slayer fan fiction writers had already explored the possibility of Buffy coming out as bisexual or a lesbian imagining her in romantic and sexual relationships with fellow Slayer Faith. Some critics felt that the pairing of Satsu and Buffy enabled the reader to better understand Buffy as a character. Jessica Maria MacFarlane of Nerdist.com wrote that Buffy's attraction to Satsu was portrayed in an organic manner, defining Satsu as providing "a sensible push in the right direction" for Buffy's character development. Curve's Lisa Gunther commended the characters as showcasing fluidity in sexual orientation.

Buffy's sexual identity, as represented by her relationship with Satsu, drew mixed responses from academics. Scholars interpreted Buffy's request for Satsu to keep their liaison a secret as homophobic, and sociologist Hélène Frohard-Dourlent felt that Buffy's decision to return to a heterosexual relationship as reaffirming heteronormative ideas. Other commentators had more positive interpretations of the pairing. While acknowledging Buffy as harboring "fears [of] becoming the target of homophobia," academic Lewis Call argued that her sexual liaisons with Satsu allowed for a deeper understanding of sexuality. Call viewed the pairing as "a positive image of a caring, consensual bi-sexual relationship," with a "mutual and flexible" approach to power dynamics, and defined Buffy as becoming "a symbol of this new queer politics" due to the storyline. Communications professor Erin B. Waggoner noted that the comics differed from other narratives on heteroflexibility through not immediately emphasizing Buffy as purely heterosexual following her interactions with Satsu. Several scholars identified Buffy's interactions with Satsu, and the post-coital images of the pairing, as establishing Buffy as a more masculine figure.

The story arc involving Satsu's sexual relationship with Buffy has been widely criticized as a publicity stunt. Several critics felt that Buffy was acting out of character as she had never previously displayed either a romantic or sexual interest in women. Teresa Jusino of The Mary Sue identified the pairing as "a clear example of wanting to show girls kissing each other for momentary shock value and reader titillation," and questioned how it contributed to Buffy's character development. She criticized the storyline as forced in comparison to the representation of Willow's sexuality, which she praised as "explored in an organic way over time." Stephen Krensky, author of the 2008 book Comic Book Century: The History of American Comic Books, interpreted the pairing as the writers' method of locating and selling to a niche market. A writer for PopMatters described Satsu and her relationship with Buffy as a failed attempt to reach out to an Asian audience. In response to the criticism, Scott Allie defended Whedon against claims that he developed the storyline for the sole purpose to make money or attract publicity. Allie categorized Satsu's sexual interactions with Buffy as an example of how Whedon writes about "often ill-conceived romance, full of twists and turns and heartbreak".

Character analysis
Scholars also commented on the representation of Satsu's sexuality. She was described as fitting the image of a femme aesthetic or the lipstick lesbian. Lewis Call criticized Buffy the Vampire Slayer Season Eight for not fully representing butch identity, citing it as "limit[ing] the comics' queer potential". Writer Lisa Gomez criticized the emphasis on Satsu's sexuality over other aspects of her character, writing that she was "degraded into being nothing but a lesbian slayer who sleeps with Buffy".

Satsu's appearance in the issue Swell was praised by some critics, who commented positively on the additional attention given to her and other secondary franchise characters. Sarah Warn, writing for AfterEllen.com, considered Satsu's friendship with fellow lesbian character Kennedy to be the highlight of the issue, and commended the comic for featuring a storyline involving queer people of color. Various academics had a more negative response to the character's inclusion in Swell. Lewis Call viewed the pairing of Satsu and Kennedy in a storyline as representative of "the drastic underrepresentation of lesbians in the Slayer army," pinpointing Kennedy's comment to Satsu—"Buffy sends the other lesbian slayer to check up on me". In her discussion of the character's ethnicity, television studies professor Jessica Hautsch felt that the issue portrayed Satsu with stereotypes of Asian women, specifically those of the geisha and the Dragon Lady.

Notes

References

Citations

Book sources

 
 
 

  

 
 
  
 

Buffy the Vampire Slayer characters
Slayers (Buffyverse)
Female characters in comics
Fictional lesbians
Fictional Japanese people
Comics characters introduced in 2007
LGBT characters in comics